Maria Lazarou (born 30 September 1972) is a retired Greek football player who played for Greece women's national football team, which she also captained, and a former football manager.

Club career 

Lazarou played for several clubs in the Greek Alpha Ethniki, and also had a spell in-between in the German Fußball-Bundesliga with FC Rumeln-Kaldenhausen.

In 2002, Lazarou was part of the squad of PAOK that played in the UEFA Women's Champions League for the first time ever, in the 2002–03 season; PAOK lost in all three matches they played, but in the final match they managed to score for one and only time, in an 8–1 defeat, with Lazarou being the scorer.

Lazarou retired in 2004, after the 2004 Summer Olympics, but she returned to playing again in 2006 as a player-coach for Illiopouli Thessaloniki, and then Aris, a club founded in 2008, and being actually the successor team of Illiopouli; Aris actually "absorbed" Illiopouli, with the latter adopting the badge, name and colours of Aris, with the newly created club continuing to play in Women's Alpha Ethniki (top-tier league) in the place of Illiopouli.

International career 

Lazarou appeared 111 times for the Greece women's national football team, including six appearances in the 2003 FIFA Women's World Cup qualifying rounds and appearances at the 2004 Summer Olympics in Athens, which she also captained, and is the top scorer of the Greece women's national football team with 26 goals.

Managerial career 

Lazarou, after having retired in 2004, returned to playing again in 2006 as a player-coach for Illiopouli Thessaloniki, and then Aris.

Nowadays, she is not involved with football and works as a private-sector employee.

Honours 

Lazarou won four Greek A Division (top-tier league) with four different clubs and one league in Germany with the semi-professional team of FC Rumeln-Kaldenhausen.

See also 
 List of women's footballers with 100 or more international caps
 Greece at the 2004 Summer Olympics

References

External links 
 Profile at Womensoccer.gr  (Archived)
 Aris Women Official Website 
 All About Aris 
 Press Aris 
 Aris AC 

1972 births
Living people
Greek women's footballers
Olympic footballers of Greece
Footballers at the 2004 Summer Olympics
Expatriate women's footballers in Germany
FIFA Century Club
Greek expatriate sportspeople in Germany
Greece women's international footballers
Women's association football midfielders
Greek expatriate women's footballers
Footballers from Serres